MCTS1, re-initiation and release factor, otherwise known as MCT-1, is a protein that in humans is encoded by the MCTS1 gene.

See also 
Eukaryotic translation
Eukaryotic initiation factor

References

Further reading